Chen Zihe (born 29 February 1968) is a Chinese international table tennis player.

Table tennis career
She won a silver medal at the 1992 Summer Olympics in the women's double event with Gao Jun.

She has won six  World Championship medals  including three gold medals; two in the team event and one in the doubles with Gao Jun.

See also
 List of table tennis players
 List of World Table Tennis Championships medalists

References

1968 births
Living people
Chinese female table tennis players
Table tennis players at the 1992 Summer Olympics
Olympic table tennis players of China
Olympic silver medalists for China
Olympic medalists in table tennis
Asian Games medalists in table tennis
Table tennis players at the 1990 Asian Games
Asian Games gold medalists for China
Asian Games bronze medalists for China
Medalists at the 1990 Asian Games

Medalists at the 1992 Summer Olympics
People from Minqing County
Table tennis players from Fujian